Highway 138 may refer to:

Canada
  Ontario Highway 138
  Prince Edward Island Route 138
  Quebec Route 138

Costa Rica
  National Route 138

India
  National Highway 138 (India)

Japan
  Japan National Route 138
  Fukuoka Prefectural Route 138
  Nara Prefectural Route 138

Malaysia
  Malaysia Federal Route 138

United States
  U.S. Route 138
  Alabama State Route 138
  Arkansas Highway 138
  California State Route 138
  Connecticut Route 138
  Florida State Road 138 (former)
  County Road 138 (Columbia County, Florida)
  County Road 138 (Gilchrist County, Florida)
  County Road 138A (Lafayette County, Florida)
  County Road 138 (Pinellas County, Florida)
  Georgia State Route 138
  Hawaii Route 138
  Illinois Route 138
  K-138 (Kansas highway)
  Kentucky Route 138
  Louisiana Highway 138
  Maine State Route 138
  Maryland Route 138
  Massachusetts Route 138
  M-138 (Michigan highway)
  Missouri Route 138
  New Jersey Route 138
  New Mexico State Road 138
  New York State Route 138
  County Route 138 (Herkimer County, New York)
  County Route 138 (Niagara County, New York)
  County Route 138 (Onondaga County, New York)
  North Carolina Highway 138
  Ohio State Route 138
  Oregon Route 138
  Pennsylvania Route 138
  Rhode Island Route 138
  Rhode Island Route 138A
  Tennessee State Route 138
  Texas State Highway 138
  Texas State Highway Spur 138
  Farm to Market Road 138
  Utah State Route 138
  Utah State Route 138 (1933-1953) (former)
  Virginia State Route 138
  Virginia State Route 138 (1930-1933) (former)
  Wisconsin Highway 138
  Wyoming Highway 138 (former)

Territories
  Puerto Rico Highway 138